Hole in One (also known as ParFection: The Golf Movie) is a 2010 American comedy film starring Steve Talley. It is about a cool undergraduate boy who gets tricked by some surgeons and they operate on him, giving him a set of breasts. Now, he has to earn money through golf for the reverse surgery. The movie was released by Universal Studios via Universal Pictures and launched in the United Kingdom on September 12, 2010. With a wide release in an additional 65 territories and countries. It is awaiting a US Domestic release. Universal 'Tagged' the movie as 'American Pie Plays Golf' and so many people have mistaken for it being an American Pie movie because Steve Talley, who appeared in American Pie Presents: The Naked Mile and American Pie Presents: Beta House stars in it. Steve Talley's character is called 'Eric Keller' in Hole in One and is called 'Dwight Stifler' in the American Pie movie Franchise series which shows the distinct differences between the movies. Box Office figures report £1,600,000 GBP in London England. Universal release Hole in One in a total of 65 countries. No other figures reported.

Plot
Eric Keller (Steve Talley) is a college student who normally skips classes to hustle random people at a nearby golf course; while winning a round of golf against someone, Keller is secretly being spied on by two anonymous men.  Later that evening, he attends a party with his friends, including Tyler Hayden (David Ellison) a dropout who is hoping to turn his golf clothing business, PAHR Fairway-Essentials, into a success, as well as Mark Zbeitnefski (K.T. Tatara) and Jason Jones (Jerad Anderson), who both focus more on pursuing college girls.  Also at the party is Tyler's sister, Mandy (Sandy Modic) who almost shares an intimate moment with Keller before being chased off by Tyler, who doesn't approve of a relationship between the two because of Keller's lifestyle.  After Mandy leaves the party, Keller is talked into having sex with a random student at the party; Keller is caught when Mark secretly records them together and plays the tape at Tyler's PAHR shop the next day, hurting Mandy in the process.

Keller is talked into taking on the same two anonymous men spying on him the previous day, who are revealed to be plastic surgeons Dr. Carlton (Dean Cameron) and Dr. Hamilton (Christopher Showerman) from their own company NuBoobs.  Keller signs an agreement that if he wins, he'll get $50,000, but if the surgeons win, Keller becomes a test patient for any projects they have in mind.  It's soon discovered that the same guy helping Keller hustle people on the course has now appeared to help these two surgeons hustle Keller instead.  After Keller loses, he attempts to bail on the surgeons but gets tased unconscious.  Keller wakes up the next morning in his own home only to discover he's been given breast implants overnight by the surgeons.

Along with Tyler, Keller visits the surgeons demanding the operation to be reversed, but they'll only do it for $50,000 and give Keller two weeks to get said money or else they mail his post-surgery pictures out to his family and friends.  Tyler attempts to get rapper Darius "Ice Pyk" Vernon to sponsor PAHR, but he brings Mark to the meeting, whose dialogue gets both of them kicked out of Ice Pyk's building.  Convinced by Tyler to do so, Keller heads back to the golf course and begins winning rounds of golf for money against various people, eventually becoming comfortable in golfing with implants.  During these series of events, Keller is pursued by a repo man (Dean Cain) who is constantly trying to collect Keller's mustang that he's behind with payments on; the repo man eventually succeeds, but immediately wrecks the vehicle after the brakes were cut by Mark, who was only attempting to repair them.

Together, Keller and Tyler earn $42,000 in two weeks, just falling eight grand short of the surgeons' demands.  Keller makes one more offer to the surgeons, stating that if he and Tyler can beat them, the surgeons reverse the operation free of charge, but if the surgeons win, Tyler gives up PAHR to them.  During the match, Keller struggles until Mandy shows up with Keller's father.  It was revealed that the surgeons went back on their word and mailed Keller's post-surgery pics to his father.  Mandy forgives Keller for his actions, and his father convinces Keller to pursue a career in golf after seeing how much money he had won in two weeks.  This is enough for Keller to get his groove back and win the match by one stroke over the surgeons.

The surgeons declare that they won't reverse the surgery despite losing, but are soon chased down by Ice Pyk's bodyguards, while Ice Pyk himself agrees to work with PAHR, much to Tyler's delight.  The movie ends with commercials for PAHR Golf and NuBoobs.

Cast
 Steve Talley as Eric Keller
 David Ellison as Tyler Hayden
 Dean Cameron as Dr. Carlton
 Christopher Showerman as Dr. Hamilton
 Sandy Modic as Mandy Hayden
 K.T. Tatara as Mark Zbeitnefski
 Jerad Anderson as Jason Jones
 Jossara Jinaro as Joslyn Whitmore
 Dean Cain as Repo Man
 Patrick Hubbard as Roman Helbron
 Thomas Aske Berg as Fergus MacGuinness
 Rico E. Anderson as Darius 'Ice Pyk' Vernon
 Jordan Engle as JoJo the Photographer
 Jillie Reil as Cheryl - Doctor's Assistant
 Steve Giannelli as Dan Daniels
 Herme Chua as Tiger Woods
 Stephanie June as News Reporter

Reception

References

External links
 

2010 films
Golf films
2010s sports comedy films
2010s teen comedy films
American sports comedy films
American teen comedy films
2010 comedy films
2010s English-language films
2010s American films